Agabus melanarius is a species of beetle endemic to Europe, where it is only found in Austria, Belgium, Bosnia and Herzegovina, Great Britain, Bulgaria, the Czech Republic, mainland Denmark, Estonia, Finland, mainland France, Germany, Hungary, mainland Italy, Kaliningrad, Lithuania, Luxembourg, mainland Norway, Poland, Russia except in the East, Sardinia, Slovakia, Sweden, Switzerland, the Netherlands, Ukraine and Yugoslavia.

References

External links

Agabus melanarius at Fauna Europaea

melanarius
Beetles described in 1837
Taxa named by Charles Nicholas Aubé
Beetles of Europe